This is a list of composers who are either native to the country of Brazil, are a citizen of that nation, or have spent a major portion of their career living and working in Brazil. The list is arranged in alphabetical order:

A

B

C

D

F

G

H

J

João MacDowell

K

L

M

N

O

P

R

S

T

V

Z

See also
Chronological list of Brazilian classical composers
Music of Brazil

References

 
Brazilian
Composers